Chiragh Hasan Hasrat ( Born 1904, Poonch, Kashmir ) was a Poet and Journalist. He began composing poetry when he was still a student at school. He was born in Kashmir but after matriculation he migrated to Pakistan. Early in his career Chiragh started teaching at various local schools in Urdu and Persian. He wrote 16 Books. He was also associated with several newspapers like Insaa (انساں), Zamindar (زمیںدار), Sheeraza (شیرازہ), Shahbaz (شاہ باز). He used different pen names including Columbus, Koocha Gard and Sindbaad Jahazi.

Early life 
In 1920 he joined a school at Shimla as a Persian teacher where he met Abul Kalam Azad. He was impressed by him and soon left the school to meet him again in Calcutta.  Hasrat admitted that he had learned a lot from Azad, not only in the field of journalism but about politics and literature.

Career  
In 1925, Hasrat joined the newspaper Nai Dunya (the new world).Here he used to write a famous column Kalkatte ki baten under the penname of Columbus. Due to this column he became very famous and most senior journalists appreciated him.

After that he joined Asr-e-Jadeed as assistant editor where he wrote a humor column Mataibaat under the penname of Koocha Gard and it further increased his reputation as a journalist and humorist.
 
In 1926 he launched his own literary journal Aftab from Calcutta.
Hasrat also worked for Isteqlal and then Jamhoor running a campaign for India's independence.

Nehru Report 
Hasrat was a supporter of Congress and in 1928 he supported Nehru Report writing many columns in favor of it. Since majority of Muslims had rejected this report, backing it caused him to lose popularity among Muslims of India. Hasrat left Calcutta and joined Zafar Ali Khan's newspaper zamindar in Lahore.

Coming to Lahore 
In 1929 he came to Lahore to work with Zafar Ali Khan. He wrote for various newspapers in Lahore and then launched his own newspaper Sheeraza in 1936. In 1940 he joined All India Radio, Delhi.

Army service 
Soon after going to Delhi Hasrat joined the army and rapidly rose to the rank of Major.

Death 
He could not work anywhere for too long and looked for something different. But then his health deteriorated. Chiragh Hasan Hasrat died in Lahore on 26 June 1955.

Books 
He wrote 16 books.unfortunately not a single poetic collection of him was ever published.
Some of his famous books are:
 Kele ka Chhilka
 Mataibaat
 Harf-o-Hikayat
 Do doctor
 Murdum deeda

Reference list 

Urdu-language poets from Pakistan
Urdu-language writers by century
Urdu-language journalists
Muslim poets
20th-century Urdu-language writers
Urdu-language writers from British India
1955 deaths
1904 births
People from British India